Copenhagen is one of the 12 multi-member constituencies of the Folketing, the national legislature of Denmark. The constituency was established in 2007 following the public administration structural reform. It consists of the municipalities of Copenhagen, Dragør, Frederiksberg and Tårnby. The constituency currently elects 17 of the 179 members of the Folketing using the open party-list proportional representation electoral system. At the 2022 general election it had 549,748 registered electors.

Electoral system
Copenhagen currently elects 17 of the 179 members of the Folketing using the open party-list proportional representation electoral system. Constituency seats are allocated using the D'Hondt method. Compensatory seats are calculated based on the national vote and are allocated using the Sainte-Laguë method, initially at the provincial level and finally at the constituency level. Only parties that reach any one of three thresholds stipulated by section 77 of the Folketing (Parliamentary) Elections Act - winning at least one constituency seat; obtaining at least the Hare quota (valid votes in province/number of constituency seats in province) in two of the three provinces; or obtaining at least 2% of the national vote - compete for compensatory seats.

Election results

Summary

(Excludes compensatory seats)

Detailed

2022
Results of the 2022 general election held on 1 November 2022:

Votes per municipality:<

The following candidates were elected:
 Constituency seats - Ida Auken (A), 9,879 votes; Helle Bonnesen (C), 2,783 votes; Pelle Dragsted (Ø), 15,558 votes; Pia Olsen Dyhr (F), 18,758 votes; Nanna W. Gotfredsen (M), 2,333 votes; Jette Gottlieb (Ø), 3,348 votes; Peter Hummelgaard (A), 9,321 votes; Jan E. Jørgensen (V), 10,151 votes; Rosa Lund (Ø), 14,611 votes; Samira Nawa (B), 6,302 votes; Ole Birk Olesen (I), 5,488 votes; Christina Olumeko (Å), 3,476 votes; Mette Reissmann (A), 3,347 votes; Franciska Rosenkilde (Å), 15,699 votes; Pernille Rosenkrantz-Theil (A), 5,361 votes; Jon Stephensen (M), 1,550 votes; and Carl Valentin (F), 2,631 votes.
 Compensatory seats - Lisbeth Bech-Nielsen (F), 2,279 votes; Alexander Ryle (I), 1,948 votes; and Linea Søgaard-Lidell (V), 9,158 votes.

2019
Results of the 2019 general election held on 5 June 2019:

Votes per municipality:

The following candidates were elected:
 Constituency seats - Tommy Ahlers (V), 48,277 votes; Katarina Ammitzbøll (C), 6,377 votes; Ida Auken (B), 21,723 votes; Pia Olsen Dyhr (F), 20,047 votes; Uffe Elbæk (Å), 7,587 votes; Martin Geertsen (V), 4,550 votes; Peter Hummelgaard Thomsen (A), 11,611 votes; Jan E. Jørgensen (V), 8,321 votes; Rosa Lund (Ø), 7,532 votes; Rune Lund (Ø), 4,355 votes; Samira Nawa (B), 4,657 votes; Lars Aslan Rasmussen (A), 9,632 votes; Jens Rohde (B), 6,175 votes; Pernille Rosenkrantz-Theil (A), 28,955 votes; Pernille Skipper (Ø) 38,954 votes; and Carl Valentin (F), 2,074 votes.
 Compensatory seats - Simon Emil Ammitzbøll-Bille (I), 2,715 votes; Jette Gottlieb (Ø), 3,939 votes; Halime Oguz (F), 1,278 votes; and Peter Skaarup (O), 4,875 votes.

2015
Results of the 2015 general election held on 18 June 2015:

Votes per municipality:

The following candidates were elected:
 Constituency seats - Yildiz Akdogan (A), 7,037 votes; Simon Emil Ammitzbøll-Bille (I), 21,794 votes; Ida Auken (B), 18,600 votes; Pelle Dragsted (Ø), 3,827 votes; Pia Olsen Dyhr (F), 14,487 votes; Uffe Elbæk (Å), 37,478 votes; Martin Henriksen (O), 7,625 votes; Peter Hummelgaard Thomsen (A), 8,294 votes; Jan E. Jørgensen (V), 8,500 votes; Carolina Magdalene Maier (Å), 2,143 votes; Søren Pind (V), 20,903 votes; Mette Reissmann (A), 4,880 votes; Johanne Schmidt-Nielsen (Ø), 44,405 votes; Peter Skaarup (O), 28,555 votes; Finn Sørensen (Ø), 2,862 votes; and Helle Thorning-Schmidt (A), 68,809 votes.
 Compensatory seats - Laura Lindahl (I), 8,310 votes.

2011
Results of the 2011 general election held on 15 September 2011:

Votes per municipality:

The following candidates were elected:
 Constituency seats - Simon Emil Ammitzbøll-Bille (I), 16,426 votes; Ida Auken (F), 14,656 votes; Uffe Elbæk (B), 6,703 votes; Martin Geertsen (V), 5,589 votes; Karen Hækkerup (A), 7,355 votes; Lone Loklindt (B), 3,441 votes; Rosa Lund (Ø), 3,370 votes; Søren Pind (V), 42,072 votes; Mette Reissmann (A), 5,128 votes; Manu Sareen (B), 41,202 votes; Johanne Schmidt-Nielsen (Ø), 50,350 votes; Peter Skaarup (O), 24,069 votes; Finn Sørensen (Ø), 2,310 votes; Villy Søvndal (F), 20,814 votes; and Helle Thorning-Schmidt (A), 54,346 votes.
 Compensatory seats - Özlem Cekic (F), 8,685 votes; Martin Henriksen (O), 3,856 votes; Jan E. Jørgensen (V), 5,165 votes; and Per Stig Møller (C), 12,756 votes.

2007
Results of the 2007 general election held on 13 November 2007:

Votes per municipality:

The following candidates were elected:
 Constituency seats - Yildiz Akdogan (A), 2,226 votes; Christine Antorini (A), 6,181 votes; Ida Auken (F), 25,737 votes; Özlem Cekic (F), 12,377 votes; Lone Dybkjær (B), 13,684 votes; Karen Hækkerup (A), 5,517 votes; Martin Henriksen (O), 2,568 votes; Anne Grete Holmsgaard (F), 14,369 votes; Rikke Hvilshøj (V), 11,277 votes; Per Stig Møller (C), 24,984 votes; Søren Pind (V), 25,945 votes; Kamal Qureshi (F), 18,125 votes; Johanne Schmidt-Nielsen (Ø), 11,066 votes; Peter Skaarup (O), 33,434 votes; and Helle Thorning-Schmidt (A), 74,121 votes.
 Compensatory seats - Naser Khader (Y), 13,780 votes; and Helle Sjelle (C), 6,033 votes.

Notes

References

Folketing constituency
Folketing constituencies
Folketing constituencies established in 2007